Language isolates are languages that cannot be classified into larger language families. Basque in Europe, Ainu in Asia, Sandawe in Africa, and Haida in North America, are all examples of language isolates. The number of language isolates is unknown.

One explanation for the existence of language isolates is that they might be the last remaining branch of a larger language family. The language possibly had relatives in the past which have since disappeared without being documented. Another explanation for language isolates is that they developed in isolation from other languages. This explanation mostly applies to sign languages that have arisen independently of other spoken or signed languages.

Some languages once seen as isolates may be reclassified as small families if some of their dialects are judged to be sufficiently different from the standard to be seen as different languages. Examples include Japanese and Georgian: Japanese is now part of the Japonic language family with the Ryukyuan languages, and Georgian is the main language in the Kartvelian language family. There is a difference between language isolates and unclassified languages, but they can be difficult to differentiate when it comes to classifying extinct languages. If such efforts eventually do prove fruitful, a language previously considered an isolate may no longer be considered one, as happened with the Yanyuwa language of northern Australia, which has been placed in the Pama–Nyungan family. Since linguists do not always agree on whether a genetic relationship has been demonstrated, it is often disputed whether a language is an isolate.

Genetic or genealogical relationships

A language isolate is a language that has no demonstrable genealogical (or "genetic") relationship to any other known language. It is not the descendant of any ancestral language which has other known descendants or daughter languages.

The term "genetic relationship" in the sense of historical linguistics is used to group most languages spoken in the world today into a relatively small number of language families, according to proof of reconstructed descent from common ancestral languages. A "genetic relationship" is a connection between languages, like similarities in vocabulary or grammar, that can be attributed to a common ancestral language that diverged into multiple daughter languages or branches. This is what makes up a language family, which is a set of languages for which sufficient evidence exists to demonstrate that they descend from a single ancestral language and are therefore genetically related. For example, English is related to other Indo-European languages and Mandarin Chinese is related to other Sino-Tibetan languages. By this criterion, each language isolate constitutes a family of its own.

In some situations, a language with no ancestor can arise. This frequently happens with sign languages—most famously in the case of Nicaraguan Sign Language, where deaf children with no language were placed together and developed a new language.

Extinct isolates
Caution is required when speaking of extinct languages as language isolates. Despite their great age, Sumerian and Elamite can be safely classified as isolates, as the languages are well enough documented that, if modern relatives existed, they would be recognizably related. A language thought to be an isolate may turn out to be related to other languages once enough material is recovered, but this is unlikely for extinct languages whose written records have not been preserved.

Many extinct languages are very poorly attested which may lead to them being considered unclassified languages instead of language isolates. This occurs when linguists do not have enough information on a language to classify it as either a language isolate or as a part of another language family.

Isolates v. unclassified languages 
Unclassified languages are different from language isolates in that they have no demonstrable genetic relationships to other languages due to a lack of sufficient data. In order to be considered a language isolate, a language needs to have sufficient data for comparisons with other languages through methods of historical-comparative linguistics to show that it does not have any genetic relationships.

Many extinct languages and living languages today are very poorly attested, and the fact that they cannot be linked to other languages may be a reflection of our poor knowledge of them. Hattic, Gutian, and Kassite are all considered unclassified languages, but their status is disputed by a minority of linguists. Many extinct languages of the Americas such as Cayuse and Majena may likewise have been isolates. Several unclassified languages could also be language isolates, but linguists cannot be sure of this without sufficient evidence.

Sign language isolates

A number of sign languages have arisen independently, without any ancestral language, and thus are language isolates. The most famous of these is the Nicaraguan Sign Language, a well documented case of what has happened in schools for the deaf in many countries. In Tanzania, for example, there are seven schools for the deaf, each with its own sign language with no known connection to any other language. Sign languages have also developed outside schools, in communities with high incidences of deafness, such as Kata Kolok in Bali, and half a dozen sign languages of the hill tribes in Thailand including the Ban Khor Sign Language.

These and more are all presumed isolates or small local families, because many deaf communities are made up of people whose hearing parents do not use sign language, and have manifestly, as shown by the language itself, not borrowed their sign language from other deaf communities during the recorded history of these languages.

Reclassification 
Some languages once seen as isolates may be reclassified as small families because their genetic relationship to other languages has been established. This happened with Japanese and Ryukyuan languages, Korean and Koreanic languages, Atakapa and Akokisa languages, Tol and Jicaque of El Palmar languages, and the Xincan Guatemala language family in which linguists have grouped the Chiquimulilla, Guazacapán, Jumaytepeque, and Yupiltepeque languages. It has been suggested that the Vietic branch of the Austroasiatic language family is a separate branch that does not belong to this language family.

List of language isolates by continent
Below is a list of known language isolates, arranged by continent, along with notes on possible relations to other languages or language families.

The status column indicates the degree of endangerment of the language, according to the definitions of the UNESCO Atlas of the World's Languages in Danger. "Vibrant" languages are those in full use by speakers of every generation, with consistent native acquisition by children. "Vulnerable" languages have a similarly wide base of native speakers, but a restricted use and the long-term risk of language shift. "Endangered" languages are either acquired irregularly or spoken only by older generations. "Moribund" languages have only a few remaining native speakers, with no new acquisition, highly restricted use, and near-universal multilingualism. "Extinct" languages have no native speakers, but are sufficiently documented to be classified as isolates.

Africa

With few exceptions, all of Africa's languages have been gathered into four major phyla: Afroasiatic, Niger–Congo, Nilo-Saharan and Khoisan. However, the genetic unity of some language families, like Nilo-Saharan, is questionable, and so there may be many more language families and isolates than currently accepted. Data for several African languages, like Kwisi, are not sufficient for classification. In addition, Jalaa, Shabo, Laal, Kujargé, and a few other languages within Nilo-Saharan and Afroasiatic-speaking areas may turn out to be isolates upon further investigation. Defaka and Ega are highly divergent languages located within Niger–Congo-speaking areas, and may also possibly be language isolates.

Asia

Oceania
Current research considers that the “Papuasphere” centered in New Guinea includes as many as 37 isolates. (The more is known about these languages in the future, the more likely it is for these languages to be later assigned to a known language family.) To these, one must add several isolates found among non-Pama-Nyungan languages of Australia:

Europe

North America

South America

See also
Unclassified languages
List of language families

References

Bibliography
 Campbell, Lyle, ed. 2017. Language Isolates. Routledge.
 Campbell, Lyle. (1997). American Indian languages: The Historical Linguistics of Native America. New York: Oxford University Press. .
 Goddard, Ives (Ed.). (1996). Languages. Handbook of North American Indians (W. C. Sturtevant, General Ed.) (Vol. 17). Washington, D.C.: Smithsonian Institution. .
 Goddard, Ives. (1999). Native Languages and Language Families of North America (rev. and enlarged ed. with additions and corrections). [Map]. Lincoln, NE: University of Nebraska Press (Smithsonian Institution). (Updated version of the map in Goddard 1996). .
 Grimes, Barbara F. (Ed.).  (2000).  Ethnologue: Languages of the world, (14th ed.).  Dallas, TX: SIL International. .  (Online edition: Ethnologue: Languages of the World).
 Mithun, Marianne. (1999). The languages of Native North America. Cambridge: Cambridge University Press.  (hbk); .
 Sturtevant, William C. (Ed.). (1978–present). Handbook of North American Indians (Vol. 1–20). Washington, D. C.: Smithsonian Institution. (Vols. 1–3, 16, 18–20 not yet published).

External links
 Ethnologue's list of language isolates